This is a list of films which have placed number one at the weekly box office in Australia during 1990. Amounts are in Australian dollars.

See also
 List of Australian films - Australian films by year
 Lists of box office number-one films

References

1990
Australia
1990 in Australian cinema